The Science Fiction Film Source Book is a book by David Wingrove published in 1985.

Plot summary
The Science Fiction Film Source Book is a book consisting of list of science fiction film plot summaries, with information about producers, directors, and more.

Reception
Dave Langford reviewed The Science Fiction Film Source Book for White Dwarf #73, and stated that "To pick a random example, the entry on Wizards dismisses it as 'comic-orientated' without even mentioning the influence of Vaughn Bode, or Ian Miller's powerfully effective backgrounds. Nitpicking, though, is a game with no ending."

References

1985 books
Science fiction books